Edward Lee Schrock (born April 6, 1941) is a retired naval officer (1964–1988) and American Republican politician who served as a member of the Senate of Virginia from 1996 to 2001.  He also served in the U.S. House of Representatives from January 2001 to January 2005, representing the Second Congressional District of Virginia.

Early life and career
Born in Middletown, Ohio, Schrock earned a bachelor's degree from Alderson-Broaddus College in 1964 and a master's degree in Public Relations from American University in 1975. His 24-year career as a commissioned officer in the U.S. Navy (1964 to 1988) included two tours of duty in Vietnam. After retiring from active military service, Schrock worked as an investment broker and then served in the Virginia State Senate, from 1996 to 2001.

Tenure in Congress
In 2000, he was elected to the U.S. House seat for Virginia's 2nd District, defeating the Democratic Party nominee, Jody Wagner, a Norfolk attorney who later became state treasurer.

In his first term, Schrock was elected president of the Republican freshman class. During his four years in Congress, Schrock served on the Armed Services Committee, Budget Committee, Small Business Committee and Government Reform Committee.

In 2002 in his second term, Schrock defeated Green Party candidate D.C. Amarasinghe, winning 83.15% of the vote.

In 2004, Michael Rogers' blogACTIVE.com had said that Schrock is gay — or at least bisexual — despite having aggressively opposed various gay-rights issues in Congress, such as same-sex marriage and gays serving in the military. Schrock, who is married, announced on August 30, 2004, that he would abort his 2004 attempt for a third term in Congress after allegedly being caught on tape soliciting sex with men on an interactive telephone service on which men can place ads to meet other men for sex.

On November 2, in the general election, fellow Republican Thelma Drake was elected to replace Schrock. Drake took office in January 2005.

After Congress
In December 2004, Representative Tom Davis, another Virginia Republican, hired Schrock to serve as the top staff person for one of the subcommittees of the Government Reform Committee which Davis chaired and on which Schrock had served.

Schrock was briefly covered in the 2009 documentary Outrage, which profiles allegedly closeted gay public officials who have endorsed anti-gay legislation.

See also

List of federal political sex scandals in the United States

References

External links

|-

|-

1941 births
21st-century American politicians
Alderson Broaddus University alumni
American University School of Communication alumni
Living people
People from Middletown, Ohio
Republican Party members of the United States House of Representatives from Virginia
United States Navy officers
United States Navy personnel of the Vietnam War
Republican Party Virginia state senators